The Stinger is an album by jazz organist Johnny "Hammond" Smith recorded for the Prestige label in 1965.

Reception

The Allmusic site awarded the album 3 stars stating "The Stinger is worth picking up for its cover alone -- for reasons beyond comprehension, the pop-art sleeve sports a vintage drawing of the classic DC Comics hero Green Lantern, bizarrely re-colored to feature a red and yellow costume. A casual, after-hours insouciance permeates the grooves inside -- although the arrangements and mood fit squarely within the soul jazz tradition, the performances also bear a dusky allure rooted firmly in the blues".

Track listing
All compositions by Johnny "Hammond" Smith except where noted
 "The Stinger" - 6:40   
 "There Is No Greater Love" (Isham Jones, Marty Symes) - 5:30   
 "Brother John" - 3:55   
 "Cleopatra and the African Knight" - 4:55   
 "You Don't Know What Love Is" (Gene de Paul, Don Raye) - 6:50   
 "Benny's Diggin'" - 4:15

Personnel
Johnny "Hammond" Smith - organ
Houston Person (tracks 1, 4 & 6) - tenor saxophone 
Earl Edwards (tracks 1, 2, 3 & 5) - tenor saxophone
Floyd Smith - guitar
John Harris - drums

Production
 Cal Lampley - producer
 Rudy Van Gelder - engineer

References

Johnny "Hammond" Smith albums
1965 albums
Prestige Records albums
Albums produced by Cal Lampley
Albums recorded at Van Gelder Studio